Accident Investigation Board Denmark (AIB, HCLJ) is the aviation accidents and incidents and railway accident and incident investigation board of the Denmark government. The agency is headquartered in Roskilde, Roskilde Municipality.

See also

 Danish Maritime Accident Investigation Board
 Danish Maritime Authority (previously housed the accident investigation board for ships)

References

External links
 Accident Investigation Board Denmark
 Accident Investigation Board Denmark 
 Accident Investigation Board Civil Aviation (Archive)
 Accident Investigation Board Civil Aviation (Archive) 
 Accident Investigation Board Denmark (Archive)
 Accident Investigation Board Denmark (Archive) 
 

Organizations investigating aviation accidents and incidents
Government of Denmark
Aviation organizations based in Denmark
Rail accident investigators
Roskilde
Transport safety organizations